Saint-Hippolyte is a commune in the Gironde department in Nouvelle-Aquitaine in southwestern France. 

The 17th-century Grottoes of Ferrand are located in the commune, on the grounds of the wine-producing Château de Ferrand.

Population

See also
Communes of the Gironde department

References

Communes of Gironde